Artem Kultyshev (born 28 March 1984) is a professional Ukrainian football midfielder.

External links 
 
 
 
 Profile at Crimean Football Union

1984 births
Living people
Footballers from Dnipro
Ukrainian footballers
Ukrainian footballers banned from domestic competitions
Association football midfielders
Ukrainian expatriate footballers
Expatriate footballers in Belarus
FC Uholyok Myrnohrad players
FC Krystal Kherson players
FC Sevastopol players
FC Belshina Bobruisk players
FC Tytan Armyansk players
FC Myr Hornostayivka players
FC Sevastopol (Russia) players
FC Yevpatoriya players
Crimean Premier League players
FC TSK Simferopol players
Ukrainian Premier League players
Ukrainian First League players
Ukrainian Second League players